Euura myrsiniticola is a species of sawfly belonging to the family Tenthredinidae (common sawflies). The larvae feed internally in a gall formed on the leaves of whortle-leaved willow (Salix myrsinites).

Description of the gall
The pea-sized gall is smooth and globular and occurs on whortle-leaved willow (Salix myrsinites). It is large in relation to the size of the leaf and protrudes approximately one-third above the leaf surface, and two-thirds below.

Distribution
The gall or sawfly has been recorded from Finland, Norway, Russia (Kolguyev Island), Scotland and Sweden.

References

Tenthredinidae
Gall-inducing insects
Hymenoptera of Europe
Insects described in 1991
Willow galls